Centre for Children's Health Education, Orientation and Protection also known as  CEE-HOPE is a non-governmental organization that focus on the right and welfare of vulnerable children. It was established by Betty Abah, a Nigerian journalist, author and women and children's right activist. One of CEE-HOPE's major center of operation is Makoko, an urban slum in Nigeria.

Campaigns

On 15 May 2014, CEE-HOPE led a campaign at Makoko for the release of the abducted Chibok girls as part of the global campaign for Chibok schoolgirls kidnapping.

On 16 February 2016, CEE-HOPE organized a seminar with the theme "Guard Against Rape" to educate girls on sexual abuse prevention. In attendance was Chinyere Anokwuru, a former Senior Special Assistant to the Lagos State government on Women and Girls who.

CEE-HOPE was involved in the campaign for the release of Ese Oruru, a 14 years old girl abducted from Bayelsa to Kano State.

External links
 Official Website

References

Child-related organizations in Nigeria